Santa Eufemia del Arroyo is a municipality located in the province of Valladolid, Castile and León, Spain. According to the 2004 census (INE), the municipality has a population of 144 inhabitants.

See also
Tierra de Campos

References 

Municipalities in the Province of Valladolid